Richard "Rick" Meyer (born September 4, 1955) is a former professional tennis player from the United States. During his career, he won one singles title and one doubles title.

Career finals

Singles (1 win, 1 loss)

Doubles (1 win, 2 losses)

External links
 
 

American male tennis players
Sportspeople from New York City
Tennis people from New York (state)
American people of German descent
Living people
1955 births